Joel Japheth Phillip (born September 12, 1987 in St. George's) is a retired Grenadian sprinter, who specialized in the 400 metres. He set a personal best time of 45.29 seconds, by finishing ninth at the 2008 Pac-10 Conference Championships in Tempe, Arizona.

Phillip represented Grenada at the 2008 Summer Olympics in Beijing, where he competed for the men's 400 metres, along with his teammate Alleyne Francique. He ran in the sixth heat against seven other athletes, including Trinidad and Tobago's Renny Quow and Bahamas' Michael Mathieu. He finished the race in sixth place by sixteen hundredths of a second (0.16) ahead of Puerto Rico's Félix Martínez, with a time of 46.30 seconds. Phillip, however, failed to advance into the semi-finals, as he placed thirty-ninth overall, and was ranked farther below three mandatory slots for the next round.

Phillip was a member of the track and field team for the Arizona State Sun Devils, and a graduate of recreation and exercise management at the Arizona State University in Tempe.

After leaving competition Joel went on to coach at Lehman College  and then at the University of the District of Columbia.

Achievements

References

External links

Profile – Arizona State Sun Devils
NBC 2008 Olympics profile

Grenadian male sprinters
Living people
Olympic athletes of Grenada
Athletes (track and field) at the 2008 Summer Olympics
People from St. George's, Grenada
Arizona State University alumni
Arizona State Sun Devils men's track and field athletes
1987 births